"Flava in Ya Ear" is the debut single by American rapper Craig Mack, from his album Project Funk da World. The original club mix single was released on 12-inch vinyl in July 1994 on the Bad Boy Entertainment record label, packaged with a remix that featured verses from the Notorious B.I.G., LL Cool J, Rampage and Busta Rhymes. Music videos were produced for the original song and the remix.

The single peaked at number nine on the Billboard Hot 100. It was certified Platinum by the RIAA and has sold over 1,000,000 copies in the United States.

The song received a Grammy Award nomination for Best Rap Solo Performance at the 37th Grammy Awards in 1995, losing to "U.N.I.T.Y." by Queen Latifah. It was ranked as the 422nd greatest song of all time by Rolling Stone Magazine in 2021.

Production
According to the song's producer Easy Mo Bee, the track was originally intended for Apache, who was unable to record the song due to being on tour with the group Naughty by Nature at the time, and was not sure of future recordings at the time. As a result, Mo Bee gave the instrumental to Craig Mack after Bad Boy Records' founder Sean Combs gave him a substantial amount of money for the instrumental.

Music video
The music video for the song was directed by Craig Henry. It was filmed in and outside of the New York Hall of Science in Queens, New York City, as well as in front of the nearby Unisphere.

Remix
The remix of the song contains the same backing track, but with new verses by the Notorious B.I.G., LL Cool J, Rampage, Busta Rhymes and Craig Mack himself. It also contains ad libs by Puff Daddy, as well as brief singing by Keisha Spivey.

The remix was included in Bad Boy's 10th Anniversary... The Hits album.

The music video for the remix was directed by Hype Williams, and was filmed on a soundstage in black-and-white by Isidro Urquia. It features all the artists from the song, as well as guest appearances by Das EFX, Mic Geronimo, Irv Gotti and Funkmaster Flex, although none perform on the song.

Charts

Weekly charts

Year-end charts

Certifications

References

1994 debut singles
Arista Records singles
Bad Boy Records singles
Craig Mack songs
Music videos directed by Hype Williams
Song recordings produced by Easy Mo Bee
Black-and-white music videos
The Notorious B.I.G. songs
Songs written by Paul Williams (songwriter)
Songs written by Roger Nichols (songwriter)
1994 songs